Mount Qilai is a mountain in Xiulin Township, Hualien County, Taiwan. It is named after the Sakizaya people.

See also
List of mountains in Taiwan

References

Landforms of Hualien County
Qilai